The Izvoarele is a right tributary of the river Vedea in Romania. It discharges into the Vedea near Cervenia.

References

Rivers of Romania
Rivers of Teleorman County